is a Japanese professional baseball outfielder for the Orix Buffaloes in Japan's Nippon Professional Baseball.

External links

NPB.com

1981 births
Living people
People from Kanazawa, Ishikawa
Japanese expatriate baseball players in the United States
Orix BlueWave players
Orix Buffaloes players
Baseball people from Ishikawa Prefecture
Japanese baseball coaches
Nippon Professional Baseball coaches
North Shore Honu players